Fack ju Göhte 3 (intentional misspelling of "Fuck you, Goethe") is a 2017 German comedy directed by Bora Dağtekin and starring Elyas M'Barek and Jella Haase, while upcoming actors Max von der Groeben and Gizem Emre appear as supporting roles. The film, produced by Constantin Film, is the sequel to the 2015 film Fack ju Göhte 2. It premiered on 22 October 2017 in Munich and was released nationwide four days later. The third part is the final installament of the series.

Cast 
 Elyas M'Barek as Zeki Müller
 Jella Haase as Chantal
 Sandra Hüller as Biggi Enzberger
 Katja Riemann as Gudrun Gerster
 Max von der Groeben as Danger
 Gizem Emre as Zeynep
 Aram Arami as Burak
 Lucas Reiber as Etienne
 Anna Lena Klenke as Laura Schnabelstedt
 Runa Greiner as Meike
 Lea van Acken as Amrei Keiser
 Uschi Glas as Ingrid Leimbach-Knorr
 Jana Pallaske as Charlie
 Farid Bang as Paco
 Michael Maertens as Eckhard Badebrecht
 Bernd Stegemann as Gundlach
 Corinna Harfouch as Kerstin
 Irm Hermann as Ploppis grandma
 Julia Dietze as Angelika Wiechert
 Anton Petzold as Justin
 Tristan Göbel as Schütte
 Rafael Koussouris as Hasko
 Pamela Knaack as Jackie Ackermann

Production

Casting 
Elyas M'Barek and Jella Haase reprised their main roles from the first two films. Katja Riemann, Max von der Groeben, Gizem Emre, Aram Arami reappeared as well, while Karoline Herfurth, present in Fack ju Göhte and Fack ju Göhte 2, dropped out of the project due to scheduling conflicts. As a replacement, Sandra Hüller was cast, playing a similar role.

Filming 
Filming took place in Munich and Kirchheim bei München. The Lise-Meitner-Gymnasium in Unterhaching served as the backdrop of the Goethe-Gesamtschule.

References

External links 
 

German comedy films
2010s high school films
German sequel films
2010s German films